Badister grandiceps is a species of ground beetle in the genus Badister. It can be found in Canada and the United States and it is brown on colour.

References

Licininae
Beetles described in 1920
Beetles of North America